Hughes High School may refer to:

Hughes High School, Hughes, Arkansas
Langston Hughes High School, Fairborn, Georgia
Hughes Center High School, Cincinnati, Ohio

See also
Hughes Springs High School